The Lancaster Red Roses baseball team, originally known as the Maroons, changed its name at the start of the 1906 season during a bitter match with the York, Pennsylvania-based White Roses. Some sources indicate that the rival teams were named for the opposing factions in England's historic Wars of the Roses.  The Lancaster Red Roses played at Stumpf Field in Manheim Township, Pennsylvania, which is still used today by local baseball and softball leagues.

History

19th century

Organized baseball first came to Lancaster, Pennsylvania in 1884 when Lancaster had two teams for a brief period of time. The Lancaster Red Stockings played 19 games as a member of the short-lived Keystone Association before the league broke up in June 1884. The Lancaster Ironsides played in the Eastern League beginning in 1884. The team remained in Lancaster for the 1885 season under a new name, the Lancaster Lancasters. Baseball returned for Lancaster in the 1894 season when the Pennsylvania State League Altoona, Pennsylvania franchise moved to Lancaster for most of the 1894 season and the 1895 season.

In 1896, the Atlantic League Lancaster Maroons began play when the New Haven, Connecticut team moved to Lancaster. The Maroons became very popular and became one of the powerhouse teams in the Atlantic League. On field successes didn't save the franchise, due to player salaries being higher than the team income. The team folded at the end of the 1899 season.

20th century

In 1904, a local businessman built a new ballpark and began an independent team to test the local demand for baseball. After a success with local fans and businesses the team joined the Tri-State League for the 1905 season as the Lancaster Maroons. The franchise became the Red Roses in 1906.

In 1906, the Lancaster Red Roses changed their name from the Maroons, and its new name was unveiled to the public a few days before the season and drew heavy criticism from the rival York White Roses from nearby York. The White Roses manager predicted, in spite, that the Red Roses would be at the bottom of the standings column.  The Red Roses went on to win the first game, 9-4, and an even heavier rivalry began. Some sources indicate that the rival teams were named for the opposing factions in England's historic Wars of the Roses.

In 1909, the team secured its first championship in the Tri-State League, under the leadership of ex-outfielder Marty Hogan. That same year, the Red Roses signed on future Hall of Fame pitcher Stan Coveleski.

In 1932, a new team by the name of the Lancaster Red Sox, an affiliate of the Boston Red Sox, played in the city but the economic problems related to the Great Depression lead to the team folding on June 17, 1932 after only 23 games in the 1932 season. The league disbanded a few days later on the 20th.  The league returned in 1939 with only 4 teams and the Lancaster Red Roses followed in 1940 entering the league with four other teams doubling the league. The team returned to its original name of Red Roses in 1940. The Lancaster Red Roses played in the Interstate League from 1940 to 1952, and were affiliated with the Philadelphia Athletics from 1944 to 1947 and the Brooklyn Dodgers from 1948 to 1952.  

The Red Roses joined the Piedmont League in 1954, and were affiliated with the Philadelphia/Kansas City Athletics from 1954–1955 season.  They became members of the Eastern League in 1958, and were affiliated with the Detroit Tigers for the 1958–1959 season, the Chicago Cubs from 1959 to 1961, and spent their last season ever in 1961 as an affiliate of the St. Louis Cardinals.

Uniforms
The Lancaster Maroons unveiled new uniforms with new colors, this was soon followed by a name change to the Lancaster Red Roses original Uniforms included white shirt and pants, dark blue stockings, and dark blue cap with a white "L" embroidered across the front.

Year-by-year record

Tri-State League (1906–1912, 1914) records

Interstate League (1940–1952)

Piedmont League (1954–1955)

Eastern League (1958–1961)

Notable Red Roses
Stan Coveleski, Baseball Hall of Famer
Nellie Fox, Baseball Hall of Famer
George Kell, Baseball Hall of Fame

See also

 Lancaster Barnstormers

References

1884 establishments in Pennsylvania
1961 disestablishments in Pennsylvania
Baseball teams established in 1884
Boston Red Sox minor league affiliates
Brooklyn Dodgers minor league affiliates
Chicago Cubs minor league affiliates
Defunct baseball teams in Pennsylvania
Defunct Eastern League (1938–present) teams
Defunct Interstate League teams
Defunct minor league baseball teams
Defunct Tri-State League teams
Detroit Tigers minor league affiliates
Kansas City Athletics minor league affiliates
Philadelphia Athletics minor league affiliates
Piedmont League teams
Sports clubs disestablished in 1961
Sports in Lancaster, Pennsylvania
St. Louis Cardinals minor league affiliates